North Dupo is an unincorporated community in Sugarloaf Township, St. Clair County, Illinois, United States. North Dupo is located along Illinois Route 3 south of Cahokia and north of Dupo, bordering both villages. The Pierre Martin House, which is listed on the National Register of Historic Places, is located in North Dupo.

References

Unincorporated communities in St. Clair County, Illinois
Unincorporated communities in Illinois